Chase Edmonds (born April 13, 1996) is an American football running back who plays for the Tampa Bay Buccaneers of the National Football League (NFL). He played college football at Fordham and was drafted by the Arizona Cardinals in the fourth round of the 2018 NFL Draft. He has also played for the Miami Dolphins and Denver Broncos.

Early life
Edmonds grew up in Harrisburg, Pennsylvania and graduated from Central Dauphin East High School, where he played basketball and football for the Panthers. As a senior, Edmonds accumulated 2,378 total yards and 25 touchdowns, including 1,984 rushing yards and was a consensus All-State selection. He was selected to play in the Big 33 Football Classic and was named the game's Most Valuable Player.

Despite his success on the field, he garnered little interest from FBS programs due to his size.

College career
Edmonds played for Fordham from 2014 to 2017. As a freshman, Edmonds played in 14 games rushing for 1838 yards on 294 attempts for 23 touchdowns with an average of 6.3 yards per carry, and received for 121 yards on 19 attempts for one touchdown. During his freshman season, he won the 2014 Jerry Rice Award winner and the NCAA FCS Rookie of the Year. In his sophomore season, Edmonds played in 12 games had 1,648 yards for 251 attempts and had 20 touchdowns along with five receiving touchdowns. In his junior year, Edmonds played in 11 games rushing for 1,799 yards on 257 attempts and had 19 touchdowns with 1 receiving touchdown. Against Lafayette, Edmonds set an FCS record by averaging 21.1 yards per carry (359 yards on 17 carries). In his final season with the Rams, Edmonds was injured and only played in seven games, rushing for 577 yards on 136 attempts with five touchdowns. Against Holy Cross, Edmonds set the Patriot League career rushing record. Edmonds finished his college career ranked fifth in NCAA FCS history with 5,862 career rushing yards.
He graduated with a degree in Communications.

College statistics

Professional career

Arizona Cardinals
Edmonds was drafted by the Arizona Cardinals in the fourth round (134th overall) of the 2018 NFL Draft. On May 11, 2018, he signed his rookie contract.

2018
Edmonds made his NFL debut on September 9, 2018 in a 24–6 loss to the Washington Redskins, rushing four times for 24 yards and catching four passes for 24 yards. Edmonds scored his first two professional touchdowns on December 2, 2018 in a 20-17 win over the Green Bay Packers. Overall, he finished his rookie season with 60 carries for 208 yards and two touchdowns.

2019
During Week 7 against the New York Giants, Edmonds posted his first career 100+-yard game as he finished with 126 rushing yards with three touchdowns, helping the Cardinals win 27-21. Overall, in the 2019 season, Edmonds finished with 303 rushing yards and four rushing touchdowns to go along with 12 receptions for 105 receiving yards and one receiving touchdown.

2020
In Week 7 against the Seattle Seahawks, Edmonds recorded 145 yards from scrimmage during the 37–34 overtime win. Edmonds finished the season appearing in sixteen games and starting in two with 97 rushing attempts for 448 yards and one rushing touchdown, and 53 receptions for 402 yards and four receiving touchdowns as well as 18 kick returns for 417 yards, the longest being 54 yards and the average being 23 yards.

2021
Edmonds entered the 2021 season as the Cardinals starting running back for the first time of his career, ahead of free agent signee James Conner. He started the first nine games before suffering a high ankle sprain in Week 9. He was placed on injured reserve on November 13, 2021. He was activated on December 18. He finished the season second on the team behind Conner with a career-high 592 rushing yards and two touchdowns along with 43 catches for 311 yards.

Miami Dolphins
On March 14, 2022, Edmonds signed with the Miami Dolphins on a two-year, $12.6 million contract.

Denver Broncos
On November 1, 2022, the Dolphins traded Edmonds along with a 2023 first-round pick and a 2024 fourth-round pick to the Denver Broncos in exchange for outside linebacker Bradley Chubb and a 2025 fifth-round pick. He suffered a high ankle sprain in Week 11 and was placed on injured reserve on November 22. He was activated on December 24.

On March 13, 2023, Edmonds was released by the Broncos.

NFL career statistics

Personal life
Edmonds has a daughter named Avery.

References

External links

Arizona Cardinals bio
Fordham Rams bio

1996 births
Living people
21st-century African-American sportspeople
African-American players of American football
American football running backs
Arizona Cardinals players
Denver Broncos players
Fordham Rams football players
Miami Dolphins players
Players of American football from Harrisburg, Pennsylvania